Ninja was a theme and product range of the construction toy Lego. Launched in 1998, the collection was its own theme. It had many elements of the ninja warriors from feudal Japan. The majority of the sets were released in 1998 and 1999; however, three small sets of minifigures were released in 2000 as part of the "Mini Heroes Collection". After this, the theme was discontinued, and was effectively replaced by the "Knights Castle" theme in 2000.

Background 
The Ninja theme was released as a sub-theme of the Lego Castle theme, which from 1984 had started to develop into specific factions. Lego Ninja immediately followed the Fright Knights theme, which had been in production from 1997 to 1998. In contrast to Fright Knights, Lego Ninja took its influence from a more realistic starting point and was set in mountainous Japan with medieval buildings.

Construction sets 
A total of 29 toy sets were released as part of the Ninja theme, which centred on three distinctive groups; the ninja, the samurai and the robbers. The toy sets featured a variety of buildings and vehicles, including fortresses and boats. The ninja crest was yellow with a black wingless dragon. The Samurai had blue banners bearing a golden fan. The robber's crest was a red, black and silver bull's head. The ninja minifigures were designed in a variety of colours, including black, red, grey, green and white and featured grey shoulder plates. In contrast, the samurai were dressed in black, blue and silver, and the robbers were dressed in red and green.

Legacy 
In 2010, Series 1 of the Lego Collectable Minifigures Series contained a ninja minifigure clearly based on the theme. A year later, in early 2011, Lego released the Lego Ninjago theme and associated television series Ninjago: Masters of Spinjitzu, which took heavy inspiration from the Ninja theme.

References

Ninja
Ninja parody
Products introduced in 1998
Products and services discontinued in 2000
Japan in non-Japanese culture